Withington railway station may refer to:

Withington railway station (Gloucestershire), former station in Withington, Gloucestershire, England
Withington railway station (Herefordshire), former station in Withington, Herefordshire, England
Withington tram stop, a stop on the Manchester Metrolink system in Greater Manchester
Withington and West Didsbury railway station, former station in Greater Manchester, originally named Withington